Stefan Rodevåg (born 11 June 1980) is a retired Swedish footballer.

Career
Rodevåg started out his career at his hometown club Götene IF, where he was moved up from the youth ranks to the first team at age sixteen. At age 21 he wanted to leave the town he had grown up in, so he trialed with GAIS and Ljungskile SK. In the end he made the move to nearby Jönköping, where he signed with third-tier club IK Tord.

In 2003, he moved up another level to second-tier Superettan when he signed with Kalmar FF. He, however, found it hard to compete for playing time with the club's Brazilian forwards and moved on loan to Falkenbergs FF in 2004, a move that was made permanent the following season.

The years that followed would prove to be the most successful in his career, and, after he became the top goalscorer of the 2006 Superettan, he got another shot at playing in the Swedish top-tier Allsvenskan, this time with Örebro SK. There he had a good first season, but injuries during his second year and a change of managers caused the club not to extend his contract. In 2009 Rodevåg returned to Falkenberg.

Rodevåg retired after the 2017 season.

Career statistics

References

External links

1980 births
Kalmar FF players
Falkenbergs FF players
Örebro SK players
Allsvenskan players
Superettan players
Swedish footballers
Living people
Association football forwards
Götene IF players
People from Götene Municipality
Sportspeople from Västra Götaland County